The 2015 Skyrunner World Series was the 14th edition of the global skyrunning competition, Skyrunner World Series, organised by the International Skyrunning Federation from 2002. 

Same format of the seasons 2013 and 2014.

Results

Category Sky

Category Ultra

Category Vertical

References

External links
 Skyrunner World Series

2015